Typhoid Mary Fisk (née Walker), also known as Bloody Mary and Mutant Zero, is a supervillain appearing in American comic books published by Marvel Comics. The character was initially depicted as an enemy of Daredevil suffering from dissociative identity disorder, but has also come into conflict with Spider-Man and Deadpool, ultimately marrying the crime boss the Kingpin (Wilson Fisk), as his second wife.

The character was portrayed in the film Elektra by Natassia Malthe. Alice Eve portrayed the character in the second season of the Marvel Cinematic Universe television series Iron Fist.

Publication history 
Typhoid Mary first appeared in Daredevil #254 (May 1988), and was created by writer Ann Nocenti and artist John Romita Jr. Her name comes from early 20th-century Irish-American cook and typhoid fever carrier "Typhoid Mary" Mallon.

The character first appeared as Mutant Zero in Avengers: The Initiative #4 (September 2007) as a member of Henry Peter Gyrich's black ops team but she was eventually revealed to be this character. Prior to this, writer Dan Slott stated that the "mysterious character" was secretly a well-known character in disguise.

Fictional character biography 
Typhoid Mary is an enemy and former lover of Daredevil with low level psionic powers, including telekinesis. She has been a professional criminal employed by organized crime syndicates as an assassin in the past. She is also gravely mentally ill.

Born Lyla, she grew up "somewhere out in New Mexico" and ran away from home to escape an abusive father. She came to New York City hoping to become a dancer or an actress, but she instead started working for a brothel frequented by criminals and organized crime.

Her condition was accidentally caused when Matt Murdock had tracked a villain down to the brothel where Mary worked. Matt attacked the man, but surprisingly, the women working at the brothel surrounded and attacked Matt. Panicking, Matt lashed out, knocking Mary out of the window. It was at this moment that she somehow became "Typhoid Mary" and vowed no man would ever hurt her again. In later appearances, however, she would imply that she was a victim of child abuse. 

Suffering from dissociative identity disorder, Mary Walker has three other abnormal personalities in addition to her seemingly healthy one. Her "Mary" personality is a timid, quiet, pacifist; her "Typhoid" personality is adventurous, lustful, and violent; and her "Bloody Mary" persona is brutal, sadistic, and misandrous. Mary once claimed that there was a fourth personality who is 'lost' but has not since been mentioned. Aside from highly developed martial arts skills, she also possesses telekinetic powers and, more dangerously, pyrokinesis, the ability to set people or objects in her immediate vicinity aflame.

In her first appearance, she met Murdock, and was hired as an assassin by the Kingpin. She then first battled Daredevil, while beginning a romance with Murdock. She temporarily reverted to her "Mary" personality, but then reverted to her "Typhoid" personality, and began a romance with the Kingpin. She hired Bullet, Bushwacker, Ammo, and the Wild Boys to attack Daredevil, and then personally led these criminals against the blind vigilante.

A favorite pawn of the Kingpin, Typhoid frequently battled and had a love-hate relationship with Daredevil before disappearing. Through hypnosis, the abnormal and psychotic personalities were suppressed from Walker's consciousness, and she began to lead a normal life, becoming an actress on a soap opera. She was sent by Doctor Doom to learn the secrets of Kymellian technology from Power Pack during the Acts of Vengeance. She was subsequently in the Kingpin's employ once again, and met Bullseye. She helped thwart an attempt on the Kingpin's life by Crossbones. At one point, as she struggled to keep her multiple personalities under control, she befriended Mary Jane Watson and battled Spider-Man when Bloody Mary resurfaced and she began killing men who committed domestic abuse. With the web-slinger's help, Mary regained control and voluntarily turned herself in to the police for treatment.

At one point, Mary was confined to a mental institution where each personality hired a mercenary. Mary hired Deadpool to kill her, Typhoid hired Deadpool to break her out, and Bloody Mary hired The Vamp/Animus to break her out to resume a killing spree. Deadpool defeated the Vamp/Animus but refused to kill Mary, allowing the Typhoid personality to become dominant. Typhoid and Deadpool had a few adventures together, including traveling to New York City to confront Daredevil for accidentally kicking her out of the brothel some years ago (as she regained the memories of this incident when Deadpool pushed her out of a window), before Deadpool attempted to reform Typhoid. This did not go well and the two eventually separated after she raped Deadpool while disguised as Siryn.

Following a series of events involving the Kingpin (fall from power, subsequent near-death coma, recovery, rising back to power, and taking out enemies to retake the criminal empire), the Kingpin distracts Daredevil by paying a visit to Walker at her show and, with a blunt slap, released the abnormal personalities. Murdock's bodyguards Luke Cage and Jessica Jones managed to take her down after she confronted Daredevil's secret identity and set the man on fire. Mary was imprisoned on a maximum security prison for super-powered criminals.

Electro later led an attack on the Raft, breaking out the prisoners. While the Avengers arrived and managed to stop some of the prisoners, Mary managed to escape and was briefly mentioned as once more working for the Kingpin.

At some point after the superhuman Civil War's events, she is found and recruited into Henry Peter Gyrich's Initiative program as "Mutant Zero", although her true identity was kept secret from her teammates. It's unknown whether she suffered some sort of psychotic episode which left her too unstable to be left to her own devices or whether she sought out treatment and joined of her own free will. Gyrich reveals that Mutant Zero is a mutant that not only remained empowered following M-Day, but one that is not included in the official record of the remaining mutants. Technically not existing in any official capacity, her true identity is made classified and she is given the Mutant Zero codename. According to Dr. Leonard Samson, Mutant Zero is still mentally unstable and that referencing any of her other identities could lead to a period of instability. Mutant Zero is inducted into the Shadow Initiative (the Initiative's black ops team), but she can only be 'activated' once per mission due to her mental instability.

When Taskmaster is appointed as the Shadow Initiative's field leader, Taskmaster senses something familiar about Mutant Zero's body language (thanks to Taskmaster's superhuman ability), and initiates an impromptu sparring match with her to satisfy this curiosity. After witnessing her fighting style and provoking her into using her pyrokinesis, Taskmaster shatters her helmet's faceplate and reveals her true identity.

As the Shadow Initiative prepares to capture Hardball in Madripoor, Mary reveals that the reason why she joined the Initiative is because she couldn't merge or block out her four personalities, so she offered to join in exchange for a pardon and to help integrate her fractured mind, which is still a work in progress. During the Shadow Initiative's fight against HYDRA, Mary loses control of her personalities, having spent too much time from the Zero Room, and flees into the wilds of Madripoor.

During the "Shadowland" storyline, Mary answers Daredevil's call for superheroes to join The Hand in providing martial law for an ever-increasing area of New York City. She claims that her time in the Initiative was successful in integrating her fractured mind, but Daredevil does not believe her. Following the war, Kingpin—using secret code words to activate her fourth personality—reveals that she was an inside agent who was ignorant of her 'true' goal all along.

Typhoid Mary joins the Sisterhood of Mutants, as Lady Deathstrike promises to use Arkea to reintegrate Mary's personalities, which Arkea then does. The sisterhood, specifically Arkea and Amora, resurrect Selene and Madelyne Pryor. Before the Sisterhood can recruit additional members and go on an offensive, the X-Men attack. Typhoid Mary is defeated by Psylocke. Arkea is killed, while Madelyne swears to maintain the Sisterhood and continue the war against the X-Men.

During the "Infinity Wars" storyline, Typhoid Mary is among the villains that accompany Turk Barrett to a meeting with the Infinity Watch at Central Park.

Powers and abilities 
Typhoid Mary is a mutant and possesses a number of limited psionic powers. She can use telekinesis to levitate small objects over short distances (such as weapons of under 10 pounds; knives, razors, etc., which her "Bloody Mary" persona often gathered and assembled into improvised battle-armor). She is a powerful pyrokinetic, meaning she can cause spontaneous combustion within line of sight to set objects in her immediate vicinity aflame. She can implant mental suggestions in the minds of others. She can use her psionic hypnosis ability to induce sleep in weak-minded individuals and most animals; certain individuals are mentally resistant to her hypnotic powers.

However, she has three separate personalities as a result of her mental illness. The timid, pacifist "Mary" personality has no psionic abilities. The "Typhoid" personality has the full range of these psionic powers which are strongest in the "Bloody Mary" personality. Her original "Mary Walker" personality is supposed to be a balanced amalgam of all of these, but is seldom dominant. Because of the different heart rates and voice patterns of her different personas, not to mention the different ways of dress, even Daredevil's super-senses were long unable to tell the different personas all belonged to the same woman, and she took advantage of this situation to hide from Daredevil/Matt Murdock even within earshot.

As Mutant Zero, Mary appears to possess the same psionic powers utilized by both Typhoid and Bloody Mary. It is unknown whether the powers Mutant Zero possesses are equal to or stronger than those of Bloody Mary. Recent battles suggest they are more powerful, but take their toll on Mary when used as a result of this strength. Mutant Zero is also equipped with a suit of full body armor that appears to enhance her physical strength and an arsenal of weapons, including guns and various blades.

Typhoid Mary is in excellent physical condition. She has sufficient reflexes to block and redirect a bullet back at its shooter. She has peak human agility, and is highly athletic. She is also trained in the martial arts, particularly Judo and Kendo. She has exceptional skill in wielding and throwing bladed weapons, and is usually armed with a variety of machetes and smaller knives.

Other versions

House of M 
In the alternate timeline seen in the 2005 "House of M" storyline, Typhoid Mary appears as an assassin of Wilson Fisk.

Mutant X 
In the parallel dimension seen in the 1998–2001 miniseries, Mutant X, Typhoid Mary is a member of the Avengers. She is later killed by Captain America while battling the Six.

In other media

Television 
 Typhoid Mary appears in Avengers Assemble, voiced by Tara Strong. This version is initially an inmate of the Vault before eventually becoming an enforcer for the Red Skull. Additionally, a pirate-themed Battleworld incarnation of Typhoid Mary appears in the episode "The Vibranium Coast".
 Mary Walker appears in the second season of Iron Fist, portrayed by Alice Eve. This version is a former special ops soldier whose dissociative identity disorder was triggered after her squad was ambushed in Sokovia. While she became the sole survivor, she was held captive, tortured, and raped for two years before managing to escape. Additionally, she is aware of two personalities, the kind and friendly "Mary" and the malevolent fighter "Walker", with an unnamed third secretly manifesting later in the series. After Walker is hired by Davos and Joy Meachum to spy on Danny Rand, Mary tries to warn Rand. When Davos steals Rand's powers, Walker betrays the former to help the latter defeat Davos. Walker later discovers the third personality has begun operating as a vigilante serial killer.

Film 
Typhoid Mary, referred to simply as Typhoid, appears in Elektra, portrayed by Natassia Malthe. This version is Hand assassin able to generate lethal poison through her touch or breath and a former martial arts prodigy called the "Treasure" who is jealous of Abby Miller, the new Treasure. While attempting to kidnap Miller for the Hand, Typhoid and her fellow Hand assassins run afoul of Elektra. Following several fights, Elektra eventually kills Typhoid, who disintegrates.

Video games 
 Typhoid Mary appears in The Amazing Spider-Man vs. The Kingpin. This version was one of the Kingpin's personal bodyguards.
 Typhoid Mary makes a cameo appearance in The Punisher. This version is the Kingpin's loyal enforcer.

References

External links 
 Profile at marvel.com
 
 

Characters created by Ann Nocenti
Characters created by John Romita Jr.
Comics characters introduced in 1988
Daredevil (Marvel Comics) characters
Fictional actors
Fictional assassins in comics
Fictional characters with dissociative identity disorder
Fictional characters with fire or heat abilities
Fictional female assassins
Fictional female ninja
Fictional prostitutes
Fictional rapists
Fictional swordfighters in comics
Marvel Comics characters who have mental powers
Marvel Comics female supervillains
Marvel Comics film characters
Marvel Comics mutants
Marvel Comics martial artists
Marvel Comics telekinetics
Marvel Comics telepaths
Prostitution in comics